Eric  IX, (Swedish: Erik Jedvardsson; Erik den helige; Sankt Erik; d. 18 May 1160) also called Eric the Holy, Saint  Eric, and Eric the Lawgiver, was a Swedish king in the 12th century,  1156–1160. The Roman Martyrology of the Catholic Church names him as a saint memorialized on 18 May. He was the founder of the House of Eric, which ruled Sweden with interruptions from c. 1156 to 1250.

Background
As later kings from the House of Eric were consistently buried at Varnhem Abbey near Skara in Västergötland, Eric's family is considered to have Geatish roots like other medieval ruling houses in Sweden. Osteological investigations of Eric's remains suggest that he may have lived the last 10–15 years of his life in Västergötland rather than in Uppland where he died. On the other hand, the only manor he is known to have possessed is situated in Västmanland in Svealand. Eriksberg in central Västergötland has been suggested as the original family manor.

Eric had a brother whose name began with a "J"; this brother has been identified with a Joar Jedvardsson. This in turn fits with King Sverre's Saga, which refers to "Eirik the Saint, son of Jatvard". Late medieval Swedish tradition likewise knows the king by the name Eric Jedvardsson. The name of the father, Jedvard (Edward), is not Scandinavian and may point to English missionary influence. According to 14th-century tradition, Eric's mother was Cecilia, a daughter of King Blot-Sweyn. This information is disputed, however.

Legend

The only full account of Eric's life is a hagiographic legend dating from the late 13th century. The historicity of the legend has been much-discussed by Swedish historians. It tells that Eric was of royal blood and was unanimously chosen king of Sweden when there was a vacancy of the kingship. It also states that Eric reigned for ten years, which would put the beginning of his reign in c. 1150. If this is correct he would have been a rival king to Sverker I, who had ascended the throne in c. 1132 and was murdered in 1156. At any rate it is assumed that Eric was recognized in most provinces after 1156. While his paternity is obscure, there is good evidence that he strengthened his claims to the throne by marriage to the Danish princess Christina Björnsdotter, a granddaughter of King Inge the Elder. His realm did not include Östergötland, where Sverker's son Charles VII of Sweden ruled in the late 1150s.

According to the legend, Eric did much to consolidate Christianity in his realm. However, the only reliable source mentioning his reign is a Cistercian chronicle from c. 1200. Quite contrary to the impression of pro-clerical policy of the Eric Legend, it says that King Eric and Queen Christina harassed the monks of Varnhem Abbey in Västergötland. Some monks left for Denmark where Vitskøl Abbey was founded in 1158. After this, however, Eric and Christina changed their stance and allowed Varnhem to be reorganized under Abbot Gerhard of Alvastra Abbey. An early 13th-century source adds that he made donations to Nydala Abbey in Småland.

Crusade to Finland
Legend also attributes Eric with the initial spread of the Christian faith into Finland, "which at this time was pagan and did Sweden great harm". In an effort to conquer and convert the Finns, he allegedly led the First Swedish Crusade east of the Baltic Sea. "Then Eric the Saint asked the people of Finland to accept Christianity and make peace with him. But when they refused to accept it, he fought against them and conquered them by the sword, avenging the blood of the Christian men which they had spilled often and for a long time. And when he had scored such an honourable victory he prayed to God, falling on his knees with tears in his eyes. Then one of his good men asked why he cried, since he should rejoice over the honourable victory which he had won over the enemies of Jesus Christ and the holy faith. He then replied: I am happy and praise God since he gave us victory. But I greatly regret that so many souls were lost today, who could have gained eternal life if they had accepted Christianity." Eric persuaded an English Bishop Henry of Uppsala to remain in Finland to evangelize the Finns, later becoming a martyr.

There is no direct confirmation from other sources of this "crusade". However, a papal bull from the early 1170s does mention complaints that "the Finns always, when they are threatened by hostile armies, promise to keep the Christian creed and eagerly ask for preachers and teachers in the Christian law; but when the army returns, they deny the faith and despise and persecute the preachers badly". The bull implies that the Swedes already stood in a certain relation to the Finns and conducted expeditions against them. Moreover, a papal letter from 1216 reserved for Eric's grandson Eric X the right to pagan lands conquered by his ancestors. If interpreted literally this might allude to conquests in Finland conducted by Eric IX and Canute I (his grandfather and father). If the "crusade" took place, it was however probably no more than a sea-borne raid.

Achievements

Eric is portrayed in the legend as the ideal of a just ruler, who supported those who were oppressed by the mighty, and expelled the rude and unfair from his kingdom. He was supposedly responsible for codifying the laws of his kingdom, which became known as King Eric's Law (or the Code of Uppland). Additionally, a hypothesis argues that he established a monastic chapter in Old Uppsala, begun by Benedictines which had come from the Danish abbey of Odense or from Vreta Abbey. If so, he would have established an unpopular system of tithes to support the Church similar to elsewhere in Europe. The legend strongly accentuates Eric's personal piety: "This saintly king of ours conducted many godly prayers and sessions, as well as fasting. He showed empathy with people in distress, was generous in giving alms to poor people, and forced himself to wear a shirt of horsehair, which he used when he was mortifying the flesh ... How he dealt with his secret enemy which is in the sexual parts, that is seen from the circumstance, that when he observed celibacy at fasting or religious celebrations, he often took a secret bath in a cold tub of water - even in wintertime - thus expelling non-permissible body heat with the cold." While much of this should be regarded as hagiographical stereotypes, the scientific investigation of his remains shows that he consumed much freshwater fish, indicating observance of fasts.

Assassination
While the legend asserts that Eric was unanimously accepted as king, the circumstances reveal that this was not the case. Apart from Karl Sverkersson in Östergötland, the Danish prince Magnus Henriksson had a claim to the throne, being the great-grandson of Inge I and the great-great-grandson of King Sweyn Estridson of Denmark.

According to the legend, the Devil inspired Magnus in his machinations. He used gifts and grand promises to attract Swedish nobles, including "a mighty man in the kingdom". If this is based on sound tradition it may mean that Magnus allied with Karl of the rival House of Sverker. This assumption is supported by a statement in a late medieval chronicle.

Unbeknownst to the king, the allies gathered a considerable army and accosted Eric near Uppsala at Östra Aros when he attended Mass on the Feast of the Ascension in May 1160. The king, being informed of the approach of the enemy, heard mass to the end, then armed himself and the few men at hand, and went out to meet Magnus' troops. He was pulled off his horse onto the ground by the swarming rebels, who taunted and stabbed him, then beheaded him.

Some of the details of Eric's violent end seem to be corroborated by a scientific investigation of his bones (see below). Otherwise, a papal bull to his son Canute I confirms that he was killed by unspecified enemies. The short chronicle in the Västgötalagen from c. 1240 says: "The twelfth [king] was Eric. He was rashly killed in an unhappy moment. He always gave a good example while he lived, and God rewarded him well. Now his soul is at rest with God and his angels, and his bones rest in Uppsala. And he has, with God's help, made and manifested many precious miracles." In a letter from 1172, Pope Alexander III complains that some people in Sweden had begun worshiping "a man who had been killed in debauchery and feasting". Some scholars have assumed that this alludes to King Eric, and that the celebration of the Ascension Day was accompanied by feasting which enabled the surprise rebel attack. The identification is uncertain, however.

Succession

After killing Eric, Magnus II was able to take power. (Magnus I, son of Niels, King of Denmark [c. 1064–1134] has been confused with Magnus II, but he did not outlive his father.) However, Magnus' reign proved short and he never fully consolidated the kingdom before likewise dying at rivals' hands in the following year. Likewise his slayer (and possible co-conspirator in Eric's death) Charles VII, was assassinated in 1167 after Eric's son Canute I returned from exile. Canute defeated his Sverker rivals by 1173 and unified the kingdom in the decades before his death in 1195 or 1196. While Eric had been a short-lived and ultimately unsuccessful ruler, Canute established the House of Eric as the ruling dynasty and used the memory of his father to anchor his regime. He was indirectly succeeded by his son Eric X and grandson Eric XI.

Family

Eric was married to Kristina Björnsdotter of the Danish House of Estridsen.

Children
Canute I of Sweden, King of Sweden 1167–1196.
Filip Eriksson; some historians give Filip as the father of Holmger, the father of Canute II of Sweden.
Catherine; married to Nils Blake.
Margaret; married in 1185 Sverre I of Norway, died in 1202.

Veneration

The assassinated king Eric was buried in the Old Uppsala church, which he had rebuilt around the burial mounds of his pagan predecessors. In about 1167, as his son began to take power after the death of the latest Sverker king, Eric's body was enshrined, although there is no direct evidence for this until c. 1220. Eric's son Canute or Knut encouraged veneration of his father as a martyr, as seen from the so-called Vallentuna Calendar from 1198. Facts and fiction about his life were inseparably mixed together, including the alleged miracle of a fountain springing from the earth where the king's head fell after being cut off. In 1273, a century after Canute consolidated Sweden, Eric's relics and regalia were transferred to the present cathedral of Uppsala, built on the martyrdom site. The translation both displayed and extended the depth of his religious following.

Eric is commemorated by the Catholic Church on 18 May. Swedish traditions included processions on his feast day from the cathedral to Old Uppsala to petition for a good harvest. The Catholic St. Eric's Cathedral, Stockholm, is named for King Eric.

Reliquary

Uppsala Cathedral (Uppsala domkyrka) continues to display the relic casket. During the Middle Ages, each new Swedish king took his oath of office with his hands on the reliquary. The original medieval casket was melted down by Johan III, partly in order to pay off the Älvsborg ransom required by the Treaty of Stettin (1570) and to finance war against Russia. The present Renaissance style casket was commissioned in the 1570s to contain his relics by Johan's Polish Catholic queen, Catherine Jagiellon.

In April, 2014, Swedish researchers opened the current reliquary to examine its contents, and the cathedral displayed the funerary crown during the forensic examination period. On March 19, 2016, researchers announced preliminary results that Eric's relics contained injuries consistent with legends of his demise, and that they would soon publish a detailed account. Twenty-three of the twenty-four bones in the reliquary came from the same 35 to 40-year-old male (the other bone, a shinbone, is from a male from the same time period). The dead person was a strongly built man of about 171 centimeters, adequately fed and well-trained. Not only did the bones display healed wounds consistent with the Finnish crusade and a lifetime of battles, the decapitated body contained multiple stab wounds in the back from around the time of death.  Further injuries to the vertebrae in the neck could only have happened outside of battle, since during battle a hauberk would have protected those neck vertebrae.

Patronage

Eric is the patron saint of Sweden and of its capital Stockholm and his crowned head is depicted in the city's coat of arms.

Saint Eric is portrayed in art as a young king being murdered during Mass with the bishop Henry of Uppsala. In Uppsala Cathedral there is a series of late medieval paintings depicting Eric and Henry of Uppsala.

Archaeological evidence of Trinity Church

According to the legend, King Erik the Saint was slain while he attended the mass at the ecclesia Sancte trinitatis 'Trinity church' at Mons Domini. The current Trinity church in Uppsala was founded in the late 13th century and cannot be the church where Eric was slain. Scholars have discussed different locations of the older Trinity church, but the presence of pre-cathedral graves in the vicinity of the cathedral might suggest that the original Trinity church was located at the same spot as the cathedral. In an effort to elucidate this early history of the cathedral and Mons Domini, archaeologist Magnus Alkarp and geophysicist Jaana Gustafsson examined a large part of the cathedral with ground-penetrating radar (GPR). The results from this investigation confirmed the existence of an older building beneath the cathedral, in all the details corresponding with the outline of a 12th-century Romanesque church, which implies that the cathedral is the site of the earlier Trinity church.

Notes

References

Further reading
 Carl M. Kjellberg, "Erik den heliges ättlingar och tronpretendenter bland dem", Historisk tidskrift 43, 1923.
 Christian Lovén, "Erikskulten i Uppsala - dubbelhelgonet och den långa stationsvägen", Årsboken Uppland 2004.
 Svenskt biografiskt lexikon, band 14.
 Bengt Thordeman (ed.), Erik den helige - historia, kult, reliker. Stockholm, 1954.
 Lauritz Weibull, "Erik den Helige", in Stockholms blodbad och andra kritiska undersökningar. Stockholm, 1965.
 Henrik Ågren, Erik den helige - Landsfader eller beläte? En rikspatrons öde i svensk historieskrivning från reformationen till och med upplysningen, 2013.

External links

 

12th-century Swedish monarchs
12th-century murdered monarchs
Pre-Reformation saints of the Lutheran liturgical calendar
Rulers of Finland
1160 deaths
Medieval Swedish saints
Swedish Roman Catholics
Burials at Uppsala Cathedral
12th-century Christian saints
Roman Catholic royal saints
Medieval legends
Swedish folklore
Finnish folklore
Year of birth unknown
House of Eric
Assassinations in Sweden
Swedish Roman Catholic saints
Royal reburials